Acontia imitatrix is a moth of the family Noctuidae. It is found in most countries in Africa, from Morocco to Nigeria, Ghana to South Africa, Angola to Somalia, Yemen and Saudi Arabia.

References 

 Wallengren, H. D. J. 1856. Anteckningar I Zoologien. I. Kafferlandets Macrolepidoptera-fauna. :1–97.

imitatrix
Moths described in 1856
Moths of Africa
Moths of Cape Verde
Moths of Madagascar
Moths of the Middle East